Kānekapōlei was a Native Hawaiian aliʻi wahine (queen) and wife of Kalaniʻōpuʻu, aliʻi nui (king/supreme ruler) of the Island of Hawaii and aunt of Kamehameha I, who were all present at Captain James Cook's death. She called attention to the kidnapping of her husband by Cook and his men, attracting his royal attendants to the beach, answering her calls for help.

Birth and ancestry
Kānekapōlei's father was Kauakahiakua and her mother, ʻUmiaemoku. Kauakahiakua was from the Maui royal family, a descendant of Puna-I-Mua, a grandson of Mōʻī (king), Lonohonuakini through his son Lonomakaihonua and brother of Kaʻulahea II, and Kahāpoʻohiwi. Kauakahiakua had several wives including his full blood sister Kāneikapōleikauila (w). Sibling relationships were sacred and produced the highest ranking niaupiʻo births. Kauakahiakua and Kāneikapōleikauila had a piʻo son named Kapuaahiwalani (k). Her mother, ʻUmiaemoku, was one of three sisters that included Ikuaana and Umiulaikaahumanu, Kamehameha I's great grandmother as well as Queen Liliuokalani's fifth great grandmother. All three sisters were daughters of Mahiololi of Kohala.

According to; "The Voyage of George Vancouver, 1791–1795: Volumes I–IV", Vancouver records the following description of Kānekapōlei;  Vancouver writes of meeting her again in 1793. Guilt over memories of the ill fated Cook expedition had made Vancouver feel obligated to compensate with gifts as he writes; "I presented her with an assortment of valuables suitable to her former distinguished situation".

Family
Around 1762 Kānekapōlei became one of the wives of Kalaniʻōpuʻu, aliʻi nui of Hawaii island. She was not his highest ranking wife, that position was held by Kalola Pupuka-o-Honokawailani, the mother of his heir Kīwalaʻō, but was considered his favorite. With Kalaniʻōpuʻu, her sons included Keōua Kūʻahuʻula and Keōua Peʻeʻale. Their first son would contend with Kamehameha I over the supremacy of the island of Hawaii until his death in 1790 at Kawaihae. Nothing is known about the fate of Keōua Peʻeʻale, although historian John F. G. Stokes argued Keōua Peʻeʻale was merely another name for Pauli Kaʻōleiokū.

Kalaniʻōpuʻu and Cook

During Captain Cook's third voyage of exploration in 1779, he mentioned King Kalaniʻōpuʻu's favorite wife and queen, Kānekapōlei. He and his men spelled her name many different ways including "Kanee-Kabareea", "Kanee-cappo-rei", "Kanee Kaberaia", "Kainee Kabareea", and "Kahna-Kubbarah".
Cook's second-in-command, Lieutenant James King, recounted her role in preventing the kidnapping of her husband and their two sons:
"Things were in this prosperous train, the two boys being already in the pinnace, and the rest of the party having advanced near the water-side, when an elderly woman called Kanee-kabareea, the mother of the boys, and one of the king's favourite wives, came after him, and with many tears, and entreaties, besought him not to go on board".

Hearing her calls, the Hawaiians gathered around the shore of Kealakekua Bay and tried to prevent their monarch from being taken. Cook's men had to retreat to the beach. As Cook turned his back to help launch the boats, he was struck on the head by the villagers and then stabbed to death as he fell on his face in the surf.

Keōua Kūʻahuʻula
According to Abraham Fornander, Keōua Kūʻahuʻula was to blame for the initial breakout of civil war in Hawaii after the death of his father Kalaniʻōpuʻu. He had received no lands due to his uncle Keawemauhili's claim as next in line to Kīwalaʻō. Upset from the lack of any inheritance, he gathered his warriors, retainers and kahu and prepared for full battle, including their mahiole and ʻahu ʻula. They headed towards Ke‘ei where a fight broke out among the warriors and bathers of at the beach. Keōua ends up killing a number of Kamehameha's men.

Kaʻōleiokū
Kānekapōlei had a son named Pauli Kaʻōleiokū. The figure's paternity has been sourced to both Kalaniʻōpuʻu and Kamehameha I. Historians Abraham Fornander, Sheldon Dibble, and Samuel Kamakau all state Kamehameha I was Pauli's father however, sources earlier than Dibble deny this allegation and claims paternity to Kalaniʻōpuʻu. Further research has brought his paternity into question. Both Konia, his grandmother and Kānekapōlei herself, have flatly denied that Kaʻōleiokū was a son of Kamehameha I. Kaʻōleiokū was raised by his mother. He joined his brother Keōua Kūʻahuʻula's forces in opposition to Kamehameha in 1782 after the Battle of Mokuʻōhai split the island into three warring chiefdoms.

In his book; "Pauahi: the Kamehameha legacy ", George H. Kanahele states that Bernice Pauahi Bishop's mele hānau does not actually mention Kamehameha I. He attributes the suggestion of Kaʻōleiokū being a son of Kamehameha to Joseph Mokuʻōhai Poepoe who calles Pauli; "ke keiki kamahaʻo" ("the love child"). Kanahele also states that Mary Kawena Pūkuʻi described this as part of the training of each warrior, and supposedly Kānekapōlei was chosen for this training. The author points out that the incident that created the doubt was when Keōua Kūʻahuʻula was killed at the consecration of the Puʻukoholā Heiau and Kamehameha announced that Kaʻōleiokū was the child of his beardless youth thus sparing his life. However in his note on that claim, Kanahele refers to Stokes as a counter; "For those who claim that Kamehameha did not father Kaʻōleiokū, the case is advanced by John F. B. Stokes in "Kaoleioku, Paternity and Biographical Sketch,". Her descendants by this son include Ruth Keʻelikōlani and Bernice Pauahi Bishop, founder of the Kamehameha School.  Elizabeth Kekaaniauokalani Kalaninuiohilaukapu Pratt claims that Kamehameha I stopped the death by calling Kaʻōleiokū his "keiki", meaning anything from his son to a nephew or even the son of a friend. Pratt states that Kamehameha's authority saved the boy and also brought him into the House of Kamehameha.

Associated children
Kānekapōlei was also said to be the mother of Keliʻikahekili, one of the wives of Kameʻeiamoku and mother of Hoapili, although the father is not mentioned.

Another figure often associated with Kānekapōlei is Kahiwa or Regina Kānekapōlei who was the mother of Kipikane, the wife of John Palmer Parker. Her father was Kamehameha I however, according to Edith McKinzie, her mother was Kauhilanimaka (w).

Family Tree

References

Bibliography
 
 
 
 
 
 
 
 
 
 
 
 
 
 
 
 
 
 

Royalty of Hawaii (island)
Hawaiian queens consort
Hawaiian royal consorts
House of Keawe
Remarried royal consorts